Stardrive may refer to:

StarDrive, a 4X space strategy game released in 2013 for Microsoft Windows
"Star drive", alternate name for Torx screw drives
"Stardrive", a 1981 episode of Blake's 7
Star*Drive, a setting for the role-playing game Alternity, published in 1998 by TSR, Inc.